Another Child is a 2019 South Korean drama film directed by Kim Yoon-seok, starring Yum Jung-ah, Kim So-jin, Kim Hye-jun and Park Se-jin. The movie garnered 3 nominations in the 56th Grand Bell Awards but did not win any.

Cast 
 Yum Jung-ah as Young-joo
 Kim So-jin as Mi-hee 
 Kim Hye-jun as Joo-ri
 Park Se-jin as Yoon-ah
 Kim Yoon-seok as Dae-won
 Kim Hee-won as Teacher Kim
 Lee Hee-joon as Park Seo-bang
 Lee Jung-eun as Breakwater middle-aged woman
 Yeom Hye-ran as Pregnant woman's mom
 Lee Sang-hee as Nurse in charge
 Kim Hye-yoon as Jung Hyun-joo

Production 
Principal photography began on February 3, 2018, and wrapped on April 3, 2018.

Accolades

References

External links
   
 
 

2019 films
2019 drama films
Showbox films
South Korean drama films
2019 directorial debut films
2010s South Korean films